Raúl Mario Ruidíaz Misitich (Croatian: Misitić; born 25 July 1990) is a Peruvian professional footballer who plays as a striker for Major League Soccer club Seattle Sounders and the Peru national team.

He is of maternal Croatian descent and his nickname, "The Flea", stems from his small frame and his ability to get past defenders with great ball control. Ruidíaz began his career at Universitario de Deportes, a powerhouse of a club in Peru, where he became an idol during the 2011 season, at just 21 years old. In January 2012, he joined Primera División club Universidad de Chile.

Club career

Universitario
Ruidíaz grew up in the Lima neighbourhood of Villa María del Triunfo and made his first steps in club football at Primera División club Universitario de Deportes aged eight. In January 2008, the player was promoted to the first adult team and immediately loaned to América Cochahuayco, the club's filial team, directed by the coach Héctor Chumpitaz, an historic football player of the Peruvian national team in the 1982 World Cup. His first professional goal was against Hijos de Acosvinchos. After the arrival of Jorge Gonzáles, he began to play as a striker.

Ruidíaz made his professional debut in the Peruvian First Division on 4 October 2009 against Total Chalaco in the Monumental, at the age of 19. The coach at the time, Juan Reynoso, decided to play him from the start of the match, which finished 2–1 in favor of Universitario. He finished the season by scoring 3 goals in 7 games in the Peruvian 2009 Championship and also won his first National title with Universitario de Deportes. Ruidíaz has often been called pequeño Messi (little Messi) in his home country, mainly because of his ability to charge a player one on one, as well as his unique technical skills.
Ruidiaz was listed among the greatest talents of South American football by O Globo Brazilian newspaper in 2010.

Universidad de Chile
On 20 January 2012, Ruidíaz was appointed as new player of the Primera División club Universidad de Chile. Despite some early success with his new club, Raul's lack of match fitness and the emergence of young talented strikers at the club Ruidíaz fell out of favour with the Universidad de Chile manager towards the end of the season. On 15 July 2012, Ruidíaz and club Universidad de Chile had mutually agreed to release him.

Morelia
After participating in the Copa América Centenario, Ruidíaz signed for Mexican club Monarcas Morelia on a season-long loan deal for a reported fee of  €105,000. He was presented to the media in Morelia on 1 July 2016 and was given the number 9 shirt. Ruidíaz made his Liga MX debut on 15 July 2016 replacing Diego Valdés in a 2–0 away loss to Tijuana. The following week, in Morelia's home opener, Ruidíaz scored his first goal in a 2–2 draw against Querétaro. On 1 August 2016, Ruidíaz scored a hat-trick in a 4–2 away win against Santos Laguna. Ruidíaz ended the season with 11 goals which made him the season's top scorer along with Tijuana's Dayro Moreno.

Before Morelia's Clausura 2017 home opener against Tijuana, Ruidíaz was honored with a commemorative plaque at Estadio Morelos for being the club's first Liga MX scoring champion. Ruidíaz later scored the second goal in Morelia's 2–0 opening match victory over Tijuana. Later that night, it was announced Morelia signed Ruidíaz to a permanent three-year transfer. Later in the season Ruidíaz scored his second hat-trick for Morelia in a 4–0 win over UNAM. In the final game of the season, Ruidíaz scored a crucial game-winning goal in a 2–1 away victory over Monterrey. The goal helped Morelia avoid relegation, helped the team qualify to the liguilla and helped Ruidíaz win his second straight Liga MX scoring title.

Seattle Sounders FC
On 6 June 2018, it was reported that Ruidíaz would be signing a contract with MLS side Seattle Sounders FC. The signing was made official on June 29, as the club announced Ruidiaz as a Designated Player. He set club records for being the fastest to 10 goals in MLS play (in 14 games), and scoring in the most consecutive appearances (8 games).

On 10 November 2019, Ruidíaz scored Seattle's final goal in a 3–1 home win over Toronto FC in the MLS Cup Final.

In the 2022 CONCACAF Champions League Final, he scored two goals in a 3–0 win in the second leg against UNAM, in which his club secured their first title in the competition by winning 5–2 on aggregate.

International career
Ruidíaz made his international debut on 7 June 2011 in a 0–0 draw against Japan in Niigata in the Kirin Cup. In the same month, Ruidíaz was called up by coach Sergio Markarián to represent Peru in the Copa América held in Argentina, Ruidíaz was a member of the Peruvian squad that finished 3rd, after a 4–1 victory over Venezuela, Ruidíaz made only one appearance in the tournament in a match against Chile in which Peru lost 1–0.

Ruidíaz was named as a member of Peru's 23-man squad for the Copa América Centenario in 2016. In Peru's third group match against Brazil on 12 June 2016, Ruidíaz scored a controversial goal, a winner in the 75th minute by guiding the ball into the net with his arm. After a lengthy discussion between the referee and his assistant, the goal was allowed to stand, and Brazil went on to lose 1–0, resulting in their elimination from the tournament. The result sent Peru through to the knockout stage as winners of Group B.

In May 2018, he was named in Peru's provisional 24 man squad for the 2018 World Cup in Russia.

Career statistics

Club

International

International goals
As of match played 27 March 2018. Peru score listed first, score column indicates score after each Ruidíaz goal.

Honours
Universitario de Deportes
Torneo Descentralizado: 2009,  2013

Universidad de Chile
Primera División de Chile: 2012 Apertura

Seattle Sounders FC
MLS Cup: 2019
CONCACAF Champions League: 2022

Peru
Copa América runner-up: 2019; third place: 2011

Individual
Peruvian Primera División top scorer: 2013 Torneo Descentralizado
Liga MX Golden Boot: Apertura 2016, Clausura 2017
Liga MX Best XI: Apertura 2016, Clausura 2017
Liga MX Best Forward: 2016–17
Liga MX Balón de Oro: 2016–17
MLS Cup Playoffs top scorer: 2019
MLS Best XI: 2020, 2021
MLS All-Star: 2021, 2022
CONCACAF Champions League Best XI: 2022

References

External links
Raúl Ruidíaz at Football-Lineups

 

1990 births
Living people
Peruvian people of Croatian descent
Footballers from Lima
Peruvian footballers
Association football forwards
Peruvian Primera División players
Peruvian Segunda División players
Club Universitario de Deportes footballers
U América F.C. footballers
FBC Melgar footballers
Chilean Primera División players
Universidad de Chile footballers
Campeonato Brasileiro Série A players
Coritiba Foot Ball Club players
Liga MX players
Atlético Morelia players
Major League Soccer players
Seattle Sounders FC players
Designated Players (MLS)
Peruvian expatriate footballers
Peruvian expatriate sportspeople in Brazil
Peruvian expatriate sportspeople in Chile
Peruvian expatriate sportspeople in the United States
Expatriate footballers in Chile
Expatriate footballers in Brazil
Expatriate soccer players in the United States
Peru international footballers
2011 Copa América players
Copa América Centenario players
2018 FIFA World Cup players
2019 Copa América players